The Giligan's Sisig Kings (and its women's team Giligan's Sisig Queens) were volleyball teams playing in the Philippine Super Liga (PSL). The teams were owned by Giligan's Restaurant & Bar.

Roster

Men's
For 2013 PSL Grand Prix Conference:

Coaching staff
 Head coach: Frank Mauricio
 Assistant coach(s): Rommel Abella Clarence Esteban

Team staff
 Team manager:
 Team Utility: 

Medical Staff
 Team Physician:
 Physical Therapist:

Women's
For 2015 PSL Beach Volleyball Challenge Cup:

Coaching staff
 Head coach:
 Assistant coach(s):

Team staff
 Team manager: Filbert Alquiros
 Team Utility: 

Medical Staff
 Team Physician:
 Physical Therapist:

Honors

Men's

Philippine Super Liga

Individual
Philippine Super Liga:

Women's

Team captain
  Salvador Depante (2013)

See also
Giligan's F.C. (Filipino Premier League football team)

References

External links
Giligan's Restaurant & Bar 

Philippine Super Liga
2013 establishments in the Philippines
Volleyball clubs established in 2013
Sports clubs disestablished in 2013